Wintergreen is an alternative rock band from Los Angeles, best known for their song "When I Wake Up" and its accompanying music video. They have released much of their music for free online.

Members 
Current:
Lead Singer/Guitarist – Drew Mottinger
Guitarist/Vocals – Trevor Sherwood
Drums – Todd Ramsey
Bass – Danny Young
Keyboard – Matt Casebeer

Former:
Bass – Brad Vartan

The Extended Play 
Wintergreen's first EP, entitled The Extended Play, was released on January 24, 2006 and contains five tracks. It was released on the Indie label Mt. Fuji Records. It is available on Apple's iTunes music store or through the band's website.

Track list
"Waste of Time"
"When I Wake Up"
"Hard to Be Cool"
"Last Dance"
"You Belong to Me"

A video for the song "When I Wake Up" was directed by Keith Schofield, and released in January 2006. In it, the members of Wintergreen travel to Alamogordo, New Mexico to try to find the cartridges of the video game E.T. the Extra Terrestrial that were buried in 1983 by Atari during the infamous Atari video game burial. At the end of the video, the members successfully find the intact cartridges.

(Around &) Around Again 

In July 2007, Wintergreen released their first LP, entitled (Around &) Around Again as a free download from their MySpace. It contains four of the five tracks originally available on The Extended Play (with "You Belong to Me" omitted), in addition to seven other original tracks. The download features all eleven tracks, an official lyrics PDF, album artwork (closely resembling the box art to an Atari 2600 game), and the video for "When I Wake Up".

Track list
"So Long"
"Too Late"
"When I Wake Up"
"Last Dance"
"Hard to be Cool"
"Fall Apart"
"Can't Sit Still"
"Waste of Time"
"Tomb"
"Ulysses"
"ROYGBIV"

Following the release of (Around &) Around Again, Wintergreen created their second music video, this time for the song "Can't Sit Still". Directed again by Schofield, this video features an instructional "how to" on the creation of several different (fictional) substances. Included in the video are instructions on the creation of "dextropolamine 22-B" (aka "Egyptian Meth"), "pentocyclene" (aka "Hillbilly Qualudes"), and an unnamed hallucinogen. The video also features the band members shopping for the necessary household ingredients, creating the drugs, and allegedly doing and subsequently experiencing the effects of the substances.

Online presence 
Wintergreen has made nearly all of their songs available on their MySpace page.

References

External links 
Wintergreen on Myspace
Mt. Fuji Records

Indie rock musical groups from California
Musical groups from Los Angeles